A rotary jail was an architectural design for some prisons in the Midwestern United States during the late 19th century.  Cells in the jails were wedges on a platform that rotated in a carousel fashion. The surrounding of the entire level had a single opening, allowing only one cell at a time to be accessible.

Design and patent
The rotary jail was initially designed by architect William H. Brown, and built by the Haugh, Ketcham & Co. iron foundry in the Indianapolis, Indiana neighborhood of Haughville. Their July 1881 patent had the following description:

Features 

The pie-shaped cells rotated around a core having a sanitary plumbing system, which was considered an unusual luxury at that time.  The cell block could be rotated by a single man hand-rotating a crank.  It was connected to gears beneath the structure which rotated the entire cell block.  The structure was supported by a ball bearing surface to allow for smooth rotation.

Condemned
The jails encountered problems almost immediately with inmates' limbs being crushed or interfering with the cellblock's rotation. Most of the jails had to be welded in a fixed position and refitted with individual cell accesses after only a few years. All of them, except for one, were condemned by June 22, 1939. The Pottawattamie County Jail in Council Bluffs, Iowa, remained in use until December 1969. The rotary mechanism was disabled as late as 1960, following an incident where an inmate died of natural causes but the body could not be retrieved for two days due to a malfunction in the mechanism.

The last rotary jail with an operating rotary mechanism in existence is in Crawfordsville, Indiana. As per the original design, the jail could handle 16 prisoners and the third floor contained three cells for ill inmates to keep them separate from the remainder of the population. This jail had its rotary mechanism disabled around the late 1930s and the structure was condemned in 1967 and closed fully in 1973.

Legacy
The last remaining mechanically operating rotary jail is the one in Montgomery County Jail and Sheriff's Residence Indiana, which opened in 1882 and housed prisoners for over half a century. Following its closure in 1973, the Montgomery County Cultural Foundation rescued the facility two years later and established the Old Jail Museum. Having previously had its rotary mechanism welded shut, this was unwelded around 1975 so that the jail could rotate again. Following a generous bequest from one of its founders in 1985, the foundation undertook extensive renovations, although restoration of the rotary cell block was not completed until 1996. The former sheriff's home is used by the local community to house receptions and workshops.

, only two other are known to have survived: one in Council Bluffs, Iowa and one in Gallatin, Missouri.

Locations
Sources vary as to how many rotary jails had been built. One source reports that 17 rotary jails were contracted for construction but only 12 were ever completed, while others say 17–18 were actually constructed (based on jail-construction company records) whereas another claims as few as seven were ever built.

Structures still standing (since turned into museums and listed on the National Register of Historic Places):
Montgomery County Jail and Sheriff's Residence, Crawfordsville, Montgomery County, Indiana
This is the only one where the rotary mechanism still operates.
Council Bluffs, Pottawattamie County, Iowa. Used until 1969, rotary mechanism unused after 1961.
Gallatin, Daviess County, Missouri; the Daviess County Rotary Jail and Sheriff's Residence was listed on the National Register of Historic Places in 1990.

Demolished:
Maryville, Nodaway County, Missouri
Paducah, McCracken County, Kentucky—uncertain if actually constructed
Maysville, DeKalb County, Missouri
Pueblo, Pueblo County, Colorado
Appleton, Outagamie County, Wisconsin—uncertain if completed
Charleston, Kanawha County, West Virginia
Rapid City, Iowa
Burlington, Vermont
Sherman, Grayson County, Texas
Oswego, New York
Waxahachie, Texas
Wichita, Kansas
Williamsport, Indiana
Dover, New Hampshire
Salt Lake City, Salt Lake County, Utah

See also 
 Revolving restaurant

References

External links
 Ben L. Ross architects
 Ben L. Loss History of the Jail
 Pottawattamie County Jail
 Indiana Statelib Publication 7028
 Article about rotary jails on 99% Invisible.com